Acuris is a financial news and data firm known for its products fixed income research provider Debtwire and Mergermarket, a specialist in M&A intelligence. It is owned by ION Investment Group, a financial software and data business which owns Fidessa and Dealogic. ION Group bought the company from BC Partners, a private equity group, and GIC Private Limited, Singapore's sovereign wealth fund, in 2019.

Formerly known as Mergermarket Group (Mergermarket Ltd.), the company has 1,300 staff, including 600 journalists and analysts, in 67 locations around the world, with headquarters in London, New York, Mumbai and Hong Kong.

History
Acuris began with a single product, Mergermarket, which was established in December 1999 by founders Caspar Hobbs, Charlie Welsh and Gawn Rowan Hamilton. Its founding idea was that in the M&A market, “There is a lot of information out there but very little intelligence.”

In August 2006 the company, then known as Mergermarket Ltd, was acquired by The Financial Times Group for £101m, publisher of the Financial Times newspaper and FT.com. FT Group was a division of Pearson PLC, the international media group.

In 2013, the company was renamed to Mergermarket Group. In November 2013, Pearson agreed to sell Mergermarket Group to London private equity investor BC Partners in a transaction valuing the business intelligence and news service at £382m including debt. Based on the deal, Mergermarket Group was valued at 15 times its last year operating income.

On 15 January 2014, Moody's Investors Service assigned a B3 corporate family rating to the Mergermarket Group.

In July 2017, the Mergermarket Group rebranded as Acuris. The announcement of this move fueled speculation that a sale of the company might come in the next year. Indeed, BC Partners sold a minority stake of around 30% to Singapore sovereign wealth fund GIC in July 2017.

In May 2019, BC Partners sold a majority stake in Acuris to ION Investment Group, a financial software and data business which owns Fidessa, in an £1.35bn deal. BC Partners will retain a 25% stake in the company, while GIC is selling out.

Services 
Acuris sells web-based subscription services organised under six divisions:

 Fixed Income (including the following services: Debtwire, Xtract Research, and Creditflux)
 Transactions (including: Mergermarket, Unquote, AVCJ, and Activistmonitor)
 Infrastructure (including: Inframation and SparkSpread)
 Risk & Compliance (including: Acuris Risk Intelligence, Wealthmonitor, Anti-Corruption Report, Hedge Fund Law Report, Capital Profile, Cybersecurity Law Report, Private Equity Law Report, and Blackpeak)
 Equities (including: Dealreporter, PaRR, and TIM)
 Research (including: Acuris Studios and Perfect Information)

Acquisitions and divestitures 
 2007 – Infinata
 2010 – Xtract Research
 2012 – Inframation Group
 2013 - Sale of MergerID
 2014 – Perfect Information
 2014 – Law Report Group
 2015 – AVCJ and Unquote
 2015 – C6 Group
 2016 – Creditflux
 2017 – Sale of Infinata
 2017 – TIM Group
 2018 – Spark Spread
 2019 – Blackpeak

References

Business intelligence companies
Financial data vendors
Consulting firms established in 1999
Financial services companies established in 1999
Research and analysis firms
Research and analysis firms of the United Kingdom
2013 mergers and acquisitions
British companies established in 1999